Leptosiphon acicularis (syn. Linanthus acicularis) is a species of flowering plant in the phlox family known by the common names bristly linanthus and bristly leptosiphon.

Distribution 
The plant is endemic to northern California in the California Coast Ranges, from the San Francisco Bay Area northwards. It is a found below  in chaparral, oak woodland, and coastal prairie habitats.

It is a California Department of Fish and Wildlife and IUCN listed Vulnerable species, and is on the California Native Plant Society Inventory of Rare and Endangered Plants.

Description 
Leptosiphon acicularis is an annual herb producing a hairy stem no more than about 15 centimeters tall. The oppositely arranged leaves are each divided into very narrow bristlelike lobes up to a centimeter long.

The tip of the stem has an inflorescence of one or more tiny yellow flowers surrounded by many needlelike sepals. The bloom period is April to May.

The specific epithet, is derived from Latin and means "needle-shaped".

See also

References

External links 
 Calflora Database: Leptosiphon acicularis (Bristly leptosiphon)
 Jepson Manual eFlora (TJM2) treatment of Leptosiphon acicularis
 UC CalPhotos gallery: Leptosiphon acicularis

Acicularis
Endemic flora of California
Natural history of the California chaparral and woodlands
Natural history of the California Coast Ranges
Natural history of the San Francisco Bay Area
Flora without expected TNC conservation status